The Austrian Settlement and Allotment Garden Association (OVSK) was an organisation established following the First World War to support people in need of housing and the allotment movement principally in and around Vienna.

References

Non-profit organisations based in Austria
Public housing in Austria